The United Democratic Front is a political party in Malawi founded in 1992 by Bakili Muluzi. It claims to be a liberal party in Malawi and is mainly strong in the southern region populated by ethnic Yao. Bakili Muluzi was President of Malawi from 1994 to 2004.

History
The United Democratic Front is a prominent political party in Malawi that was founded in 1992 by Bakili Muluzi. Until 2009 the party was a member of Liberal International, which it joined at the latter's Reykjavík Congress in 1994.

Rise of DPP faction
It came into power in 1994 under Bakili Muluzi who was in power until 2004, serving two terms. 
It continued in power under Bingu wa Mutharika; however Muluzi remained the head of the party. After succeeding Muluzi, Mutharika came into conflict with much of the party, including Muluzi, and he left the party in February 2005 to form the Democratic Progressive Party (DPP). In 2009 it was the DPP which won the election. This led to mass defections from the UDF to the ruling DPP. The party however, continued to restructure.

Political performance
In 1994, the UDF candidate Bakili Muluzi came to power in Malawi. 
In the general election held on 20 May 2004, the UDF's candidate for president, Bingu wa Mutharika, won 35.9% of the vote and was elected. The party also won 49 out of 194 seats.

On 24 April 2008, a UDF convention, which included 2,000 delegates, chose Muluzi as the party's 2009 presidential candidate, despite questions about his eligibility due to term limits. He received 1,950 votes at the convention against 38 for Vice-President Cassim Chilumpha.

UDF presidents
 Atupele Muluzi, 2012–2022
 Bakili Muluzi, 1993–2004

UDF members
Angela Muluzi
Atupele Muluzi
Bakili Muluzi
Akefe Sukali Mviza
Esther Jolobala
Clement Chiwaya

Electoral history

Presidential elections

National Assembly elections

See also
Political parties in Malawi
List of liberal parties

References

1992 establishments in Malawi
Liberal parties in Africa
Political parties in Malawi